Charles Anthony may refer to:
 Charles Anthony (American football) (born 1952), American football player
 Charles Anthony (tenor) (1929–2012), opera singer 
 Charles Lucas Anthony (1960–1983), one of the commanders of the LTTE rebel group in Sri Lanka
 Charles Anthony, Prince of Hohenzollern (1811–1885), Prime Minister of Prussia
 Charles Anthony (politician) (1798–1862), American politician, businessman, and Mason

See also